Live at the Isle of Wight Festival 1970 is a live album by the American rock band the Doors, released on February 23, 2018, on Rhino Records. The concert was recorded at the Isle of Wight Festival in England on August 30, 1970, and this was released by Eagle Rock Entertainment. It was the group's final appearance as a foursome outside of the US and also the last full filming of a Doors concert.

The band's performances of "The End" and "When the Music's Over" are featured in Message to Love, a feature documentary film of the 1970 festival. A live version of "Break On Through (To the Other Side)" was featured in The Doors: Box Set, a 1997 box set about the Doors.

Recording
A huge crowd descended on the Isle of Wight at the last of the three original festivals, in 1970; The Guinness Book of Records estimated the total attendance at between 600,000 and 700,000 people. The Doors hit the stage at two o'clock in the morning on August 30, 1970. Their set was particularly dark due to lead singer Jim Morrison's unwillingness of film spotlights to be used. Much of the recording sees the group bathed in a single red spotlight. Jerry Hopkins in his biography of the band, No One Here Gets Out Alive, commented on the cold wind and poor weather that hampered the performance.

Hanging over Morrison was his trial for lewd and lascivious behavior from a March 1, 1969, concert in Miami. Less than a month after this concert, on September 20, Morrison was convicted and sentenced to six months in jail, with hard labor, and fined $500. Morrison appealed but died in July 1971 before the matter was legally resolved.

Densmore said of Morrison, "He was like a pot of boiling water with a lid on top. He didn't move a lot, but he sang really strong." Manzarek said of the show, "Our set was subdued but very intense. We played with a controlled fury and Jim was in fine vocal form. He sang for all he was worth, but moved nary a muscle. Dionysus had been shackled."

Releases
Live at the Isle of Wight Festival 1970 was released on February 23, 2018. The concert was remixed by long-time Doors engineer/co-producer Bruce Botnick in 5.1 Dolby Digital sound from the original multi-track audio tapes. The concert film of the band was also color-corrected and visually upgraded for release.

DVD/Blu-ray

The DVD/Blu-Ray Disc of the concert includes This is the End a 18-minute film containing interviews with Doors' guitarist Robby Krieger, drummer John Densmore, concert director Murray Lerner, and original Doors manager Bill Siddons. A 2002 interview recorded with Ray Manzarek, the Doors keyboardist who died in 2013, is also included.

Track listing

CD and DVD/Blu-ray

2019 Record Store Day release

Personnel
Per liner notes:

 Jim Morrison – vocals, maracas on "Back Door Man"
 Ray Manzarek – keyboards, bass
 Robby Krieger – guitar
 John Densmore – drums

References

Sources

External links
In pictures: Isle of Wight 1970 photos and memories
The Doors - When The Music's Over (Live At The Isle Of Wight Festival 1970) on YouTube
The Doors - Light My Fire (Live At The Isle Of Wight Festival 1970) on YouTube
The Doors - Live At The Isle Of Wight Festival 1970 (Extended Trailer) on YouTube

2018 live albums
Bright Midnight Archives